Mulholland Drive (stylized as Mulholland Dr.) is a 2001 surrealist neo-noir mystery film written and directed by David Lynch and starring Naomi Watts, Laura Harring, Justin Theroux, Ann Miller, Mark Pellegrino, and Robert Forster. It tells the story of an aspiring actress named Betty Elms (Watts), newly arrived in Los Angeles, who meets and befriends an amnesiac woman (Harring) recovering from a car accident. The story follows several other vignettes and characters, including a Hollywood film director (Theroux).

The American-French co-production was originally conceived as a television pilot, and a large portion of the film was shot in 1999 with Lynch's plan to keep it open-ended for a potential series. After viewing Lynch's cut, however, television executives rejected it. Lynch then provided an ending to the project, making it a feature film. The half-pilot, half-feature result, along with Lynch's characteristic surrealist style, has left the general meaning of the film's events open to interpretation. Lynch has declined to offer an explanation of his intentions for the narrative, leaving audiences, critics, and cast members to speculate on what transpires. He gave the film the tagline "A love story in the city of dreams".

Categorized as a psychological thriller, Mulholland Drive earned Lynch the Prix de la mise en scène (Best Director Award) at the 2001 Cannes Film Festival, sharing the prize with Joel Coen for The Man Who Wasn't There. Lynch also earned an Academy Award nomination for Best Director. The film boosted Watts' Hollywood profile considerably, and was the last feature film to star veteran Hollywood actress Ann Miller.

Mulholland Drive is often regarded as one of Lynch's finest works and as one of the greatest films of all time. It was ranked 8th in the 2022 Sight & Sound critics' poll of the best films ever made and topped a 2016 BBC poll of the best films since 2000.

Plot
A dark-haired woman is the sole survivor of a car crash on Mulholland Drive, a winding road high in the Hollywood Hills. Injured and dazed, she makes her way down into Los Angeles by foot and sneaks into an apartment. Later that morning, an aspiring actress named Betty Elms arrives at the apartment, which is normally occupied by her Aunt Ruth. Betty is startled to find the woman, who has amnesia and calls herself "Rita" after seeing a poster for the film Gilda starring Rita Hayworth. To help the woman remember her identity, Betty looks in Rita's purse, where she finds a large amount of money and an unusual blue key.

At a diner called Winkie's, a man tells another about a nightmare in which he dreamt of encountering a horrific figure behind the diner. When they investigate, the figure appears, causing the man who had the nightmare to collapse in fright. Elsewhere, director Adam Kesher has his film commandeered by mobsters, who insist he cast an unknown actress named Camilla Rhodes as the lead. Adam refuses and returns home to find his wife Lorraine cheating on him. When the mobsters withdraw his line of credit, Adam arranges to meet a mysterious cowboy, who cryptically urges him to cast Camilla for his own good. Meanwhile, a bungling hitman attempts to steal a book full of phone numbers and leaves three people dead.

While trying to learn more about Rita's accident, Betty and Rita go to Winkie's and are served by a waitress named Diane, which causes Rita to remember the name "Diane Selwyn". They find Diane Selwyn in the phone book and call her, but she does not answer. Betty goes to an audition, where her performance is highly praised. A casting agent takes her to a soundstage where a film called The Sylvia North Story, directed by Adam, is being cast. When Camilla Rhodes auditions with the song "I've Told Every Little Star", Adam capitulates to the mob by casting her. Betty locks eyes with Adam, but she flees before she can meet him, saying she is late to meet a friend. Betty and Rita go to Diane Selwyn's apartment, where a neighbor answers the door and tells them she has switched apartments with Diane. They go to the neighbor's apartment and break in when no one answers the door. In the bedroom, they find the body of a woman who has been dead for several days. Terrified, they return to Betty's apartment, where Rita disguises herself with a blonde wig. That night, she and Betty have sex.

At 2 a.m., Rita awakes suddenly, insisting they go right away to a theater called Club Silencio. There, the emcee explains in different languages that everything is an illusion; Rebekah Del Rio comes on stage and begins singing the Roy Orbison song "Crying" in Spanish, then collapses, unconscious, while her vocals continue in playback. Betty finds a blue box in her purse that matches Rita's key. Upon returning to the apartment, Rita retrieves the key and finds that Betty has disappeared. Rita unlocks the box, and it falls to the floor. Aunt Ruth enters the room to find nobody.

Diane Selwyn wakes up in her bed in the same apartment Betty and Rita investigated, where her neighbor informs her that two police officers have been looking for her. She looks exactly like Betty, but is a struggling actress driven into a deep depression by her failed affair with Camilla Rhodes, who is a successful actress and looks exactly like Rita. At Camilla's invitation, Diane attends a party at Adam's house on Mulholland Drive. At dinner, Diane states she came to Hollywood from Canada when her Aunt Ruth died and left her some money, and she met Camilla at an audition for The Sylvia North Story. Another woman who looks like the previous "Camilla Rhodes" kisses Camilla, and they turn and smile at Diane. Adam and Camilla prepare to make their marriage announcement, but they dissolve into laughter and kiss while Diane watches, crying. Later, Diane meets the hitman at Winkie's, to hire him to kill Camilla. He tells her she will find a blue key when the job is completed. The figure from the man's dream is revealed to have the matching blue box. In her apartment, Diane looks at the blue key on her coffee table, when someone unceasingly knocks on the door. Distraught, she is terrorized by hallucinations and runs screaming to her bed, where she shoots herself. A woman at the theater whispers, "Silencio".

Cast

Production

Development
Originally conceived as a television series, Mulholland Drive began as a 90-minute pilot produced for Touchstone Television and intended for the ABC television network. Tony Krantz, the agent who was responsible for the development of Twin Peaks, was "fired up" about doing another television series. Lynch sold the idea to ABC executives based only on the story of Rita emerging from the car accident with her purse containing $125,000 in cash and the blue key, and Betty trying to help her figure out who she is. An ABC executive recalled, "I remember the creepiness of this woman in this horrible, horrible crash, and David teasing us with the notion that people are chasing her. She's not just 'in' trouble—she is trouble. Obviously, we asked, 'What happens next?' And David said, 'You have to buy the pitch for me to tell you. Lynch showed ABC a rough cut of the pilot. The person who saw it, according to Lynch, was watching it at six in the morning and was having coffee and standing up. He hated the pilot, and ABC immediately cancelled it. Pierre Edleman, Lynch's friend from Paris, came to visit and started talking to him about the film being a feature. Edleman went back to Paris. Canal+ wanted to give Lynch money to make it into a feature and it took a year to negotiate.

Lynch described the attractiveness of the idea of a pilot, despite the knowledge that the medium of television would be constricting: "I'm a sucker for a continuing story ... Theoretically, you can get a very deep story and you can go so deep and open the world so beautifully, but it takes time to do that." The story included surreal elements, much like Lynch's earlier series Twin Peaks. Groundwork was laid for story arcs, such as the mystery of Rita's identity, Betty's career and Adam Kesher's film project.

Actress Sherilyn Fenn stated in a 2014 interview that the original idea came during the filming of Twin Peaks, as a spin-off film for her character of Audrey Horne.

Casting

Lynch cast Naomi Watts and Laura Harring by their photographs. He called them in separately for half-hour interviews and told them that he had not seen any of their previous works in film or television. Harring considered it fateful that she was involved in a minor car accident on the way to the first interview, only to learn her character would also be involved in a car accident in the film. Watts arrived wearing jeans for the first interview, direct from the airplane from New York City. Lynch asked her to return the next day "more glammed up". She was offered the part two weeks later. Lynch explained his selection of Watts, "I saw someone that I felt had a tremendous talent, and I saw someone who had a beautiful soul, an intelligence—possibilities for a lot of different roles, so it was a beautiful full package." Justin Theroux also met Lynch directly after his airplane flight. After a long flight with little sleep, Theroux arrived dressed all in black, with untidy hair. Lynch liked the look and decided to cast Adam wearing similar clothes and the same hairstyle.

Filming
Filming for the television pilot began on location in Los Angeles in February 1999 and took six weeks. Ultimately, the network was unhappy with the pilot and decided not to place it on its schedule. Objections included the nonlinear storyline, the ages of Harring and Watts (whom they considered too old), cigarette smoking by Ann Miller's character and a close-frame shot of dog feces in one scene. Lynch remembered, "All I know is, I loved making it, ABC hated it, and I don't like the cut I turned in. I agreed with ABC that the longer cut was too slow, but I was forced to butcher it because we had a deadline, and there wasn't time to finesse anything. It lost texture, big scenes and storylines, and there are 300 tape copies of the bad version circulating around. Lots of people have seen it, which is embarrassing, because they're bad-quality tapes, too. I don't want to think about it."

The script was later rewritten and expanded when Lynch decided to transform it into a feature film. Describing the transition from an open-ended pilot to a feature film with a resolution of sorts, Lynch said, "One night, I sat down, the ideas came in, and it was a most beautiful experience. Everything was seen from a different angle ... Now, looking back, I see that [the film] always wanted to be this way. It just took this strange beginning to cause it to be what it is." The result was an extra eighteen pages of material that included the romantic relationship between Rita and Betty and the events that occurred after the blue box was opened. Watts was relieved that the pilot was dropped by ABC. She found Betty too one-dimensional without the darker portion of the film that was put together afterward. Most of the new scenes were filmed in October 2000, funded with $7 million from French production company StudioCanal.

Theroux described approaching filming without entirely understanding the plot: "You get the whole script, but he might as well withhold the scenes you're not in, because the whole turns out to be more mystifying than the parts. David welcomes questions, but he won't answer any of them ... You work kind of half-blindfolded. If he were a first-time director and hadn't demonstrated any command of this method, I'd probably have reservations. But it obviously works for him." Theroux noted that the only answer Lynch did provide was that he was certain that Theroux's character, a Hollywood director, was not meant to be Lynch. Watts stated that she tried to bluff Lynch by pretending she had the plot figured out, and that he delighted in the cast's frustration.

"I'm not going to lie: I felt very vulnerable," Laura Harring said of filming the sex scene between Harring and Watts' characters. "I was in my dressing room and was on the verge of tears. It's hard. There are a lot of people there ... Naomi and I were friends. It was pretty awkward."

Themes and interpretations

Giving the film only the tagline "A love story in the city of dreams", David Lynch has refused to comment on Mulholland Drives meaning or symbolism, leading to much discussion and multiple interpretations. The Christian Science Monitor film critic David Sterritt spoke with Lynch after the film screened at Cannes and wrote that the director "insisted that Mulholland Drive does tell a coherent, comprehensible story", unlike some of Lynch's earlier films like Lost Highway. On the other hand, Justin Theroux said of Lynch's feelings on the multiple meanings people perceive in the film, "I think he's genuinely happy for it to mean anything you want. He loves it when people come up with really bizarre interpretations. David works from his subconscious."

Dreams and alternative realities
An early interpretation of the film uses dream analysis to argue that the first part is a dream of the real Diane Selwyn, who has cast her dream-self as the innocent and hopeful "Betty Elms", reconstructing her history and persona into something like an old Hollywood film. In the dream, Betty is successful, charming, and lives the fantasy life of a soon-to-be-famous actress. The last one-fifth of the film presents Diane's real life, in which she has failed both personally and professionally. She arranges for Camilla, an ex-lover, to be killed, and unable to cope with the guilt, re-imagines her as the dependent, pliable amnesiac Rita. Clues to her inevitable demise, however, continue to appear throughout her dream.

This interpretation was similar to what Naomi Watts construed, when she said in an interview, "I thought Diane was the real character and that Betty was the person she wanted to be and had dreamed up. Rita is the damsel in distress and she's in absolute need of Betty, and Betty controls her as if she were a doll. Rita is Betty's fantasy of who she wants Camilla to be." Watts's own early experiences in Hollywood parallel those of Diane's. She endured some professional frustration before she became successful, auditioned for parts in which she did not believe, and encountered people who did not follow through with opportunities. She recalled, "There were a lot of promises, but nothing actually came off. I ran out of money and became quite lonely." Michael Wilmington of the Chicago Tribune found that "everything in 'Mulholland Drive' is a nightmare. It's a portrayal of the Hollywood golden dream turning rancid, curdling into a poisonous stew of hatred, envy, sleazy compromise and soul-killing failure. This is the underbelly of our glamorous fantasies, and the area Lynch shows here is realistically portrayed".

The Guardian asked six well-known film critics for their own perceptions of the overall meaning in Mulholland Drive. Neil Roberts of The Sun and Tom Charity of Time Out subscribe to the theory that Betty is Diane's projection of a happier life. Roger Ebert and Jonathan Ross seem to accept this interpretation, but both hesitate to overanalyze the film. Ebert states, "There is no explanation. There may not even be a mystery." Ross observes that there are storylines that go nowhere: "Perhaps these were leftovers from the pilot it was originally intended to be, or perhaps these things are the non-sequiturs and subconscious of dreams." Philip French from The Observer sees it as an allusion to Hollywood tragedy, while Jane Douglas from the BBC rejects the theory of Betty's life as Diane's dream, but also warns against too much analysis.

Media theorist Siobhan Lyons similarly disagrees with the dream theory, arguing that it is a "superficial interpretation [which] undermines the strength of the absurdity of reality that often takes place in Lynch's universe". Instead, Lyons posits that Betty and Diane are in fact two different people who happen to look similar, a common motif among Hollywood starlets. In a similar interpretation, Betty and Rita and Diane and Camilla may exist in parallel universes that sometimes interconnect. Another theory offered is that the narrative is a Möbius strip, a twisted band that has no beginning and no end. Or the entire film is a dream, but the identity of the dreamer is unknown. Repeated references to beds, bedrooms and sleeping symbolize the heavy influence of dreams. Rita falls asleep several times; in between these episodes, disconnected scenes such as the men having a conversation at Winkie's, Betty's arrival in Los Angeles and the bungled hit take place, suggesting that Rita may be dreaming them. The opening shot of the film zooms into a bed containing an unknown sleeper, instilling, according to film scholar Ruth Perlmutter, the necessity to ask if what follows is reality. Professor of dream studies Kelly Bulkeley argues that the early scene at the diner, as the only one in which dreams or dreaming are explicitly mentioned, illustrates "revelatory truth and epistemological uncertainty in Lynch's film". The monstrous being from the dream, who is the subject of conversation of the men in Winkie's, reappears at the end of the film right before and after Diane commits suicide. Bulkeley asserts that the lone discussion of dreams in that scene presents an opening to "a new way of understanding everything that happens in the movie".

Philosopher and film theorist Robert Sinnerbrink similarly notes that the images following Diane's apparent suicide undermine the "dream and reality" interpretation. After Diane shoots herself, the bed is consumed with smoke, and Betty and Rita are shown beaming at each other, after which a woman in the Club Silencio balcony whispers "Silencio" as the screen fades to black. Sinnerbrink writes that the "concluding images float in an indeterminate zone between fantasy and reality, which is perhaps the genuinely metaphysical dimension of the cinematic image", also noting that it might be that the "last sequence comprises the fantasy images of Diane's dying consciousness, concluding with the real moment of her death: the final Silencio". Referring to the same sequence, film theorist Andrew Hageman notes that "the ninety-second coda that follows Betty/Diane's suicide is a cinematic space that persists after the curtain has dropped on her living consciousness, and this persistent space is the very theatre where the illusion of illusion is continually unmasked".

Film theorist David Roche writes that Lynch films do not simply tell detective stories, but rather force the audience into the role of becoming detectives themselves to make sense of the narratives, and that Mulholland Drive, like other Lynch films, frustrates "the spectator's need for a rational diegesis by playing on the spectator's mistake that narration is synonymous with diegesis". In Lynch's films, the spectator is always "one step behind narration" and thus "narration prevails over diegesis". Roche also notes that there are multiple mysteries in the film that ultimately go unanswered by the characters who meet dead ends, like Betty and Rita, or give in to pressures as Adam does. Although the audience still struggles to make sense of the stories, the characters are no longer trying to solve their mysteries. Roche concludes that Mulholland Drive is a mystery film not because it allows the audience to view the solution to a question, but the film itself is a mystery that is held together "by the spectator-detective's desire to make sense" of it.

A "poisonous valentine to Hollywood"

Despite the proliferation of theories, critics note that no explanation satisfies all of the loose ends and questions that arise from the film. Stephen Holden of The New York Times writes, "Mulholland Drive has little to do with any single character's love life or professional ambition. The movie is an ever-deepening reflection on the allure of Hollywood and on the multiple role-playing and self-invention that the movie-going experience promises ... What greater power is there than the power to enter and to program the dream life of the culture?" J. Hoberman from The Village Voice echoes this sentiment by calling it a "poisonous valentine to Hollywood".

Mulholland Drive has been compared with Billy Wilder's film noir classic Sunset Boulevard (1950), another tale about broken dreams in Hollywood, and early in the film Rita is shown crossing Sunset Boulevard at night. Apart from both titles being named after iconic Los Angeles streets, Mulholland Drive is "Lynch's unique account of what held Wilder's attention too: human putrefaction (a term Lynch used several times during his press conference at the New York Film Festival 2001) in a city of lethal illusions". The title of the film is a reference to iconic Hollywood culture. Lynch lives near Mulholland Drive, and stated in an interview, "At night, you ride on the top of the world. In the daytime you ride on top of the world, too, but it's mysterious, and there's a hair of fear because it goes into remote areas. You feel the history of Hollywood in that road." Watts also had experience with the road before her career was established: "I remember driving along the street many times sobbing my heart out in my car, going, 'What am I doing here?

Critic Gregory Weight cautions viewers against a cynical interpretation of the events in the film, stating that Lynch presents more than "the façade and that he believes only evil and deceit lie beneath it". As much as Lynch makes a statement about the deceit, manipulation and false pretenses in Hollywood culture, he also infuses nostalgia throughout the film and recognizes that real art comes from classic filmmaking as Lynch cast thereby paying tribute to veteran actors Ann Miller, Lee Grant and Chad Everett. He also portrays Betty as extraordinarily talented and shows that her abilities are noticed by powerful people in the entertainment industry. Commenting on the contrasting positions between film nostalgia and the putrefaction of Hollywood, Steven Dillon writes that Mulholland Drive is critical of the culture of Hollywood as much as it is a condemnation of "cinephilia" (the fascination of filmmaking and the fantasies associated with it).

Harring described her interpretation after seeing the film: "When I saw it the first time, I thought it was the story of Hollywood dreams, illusion and obsession. It touches on the idea that nothing is quite as it seems, especially the idea of being a Hollywood movie star. The second and third times I saw it, I thought it dealt with identity. Do we know who we are? And then I kept seeing different things in it ... There's no right or wrong to what someone takes away from it or what they think the film is really about. It's a movie that makes you continuously ponder, makes you ask questions. I've heard over and over, 'This is a movie that I'll see again' or 'This is a movie you've got to see again.' It intrigues you. You want to get it, but I don't think it's a movie to be gotten. It's achieved its goal if it makes you ask questions."

Romantic content
The relationships between Betty and Rita, and Diane and Camilla have been variously described as "touching", "moving", as well as "titillating". The French critic Thierry Jousse, in his review for Cahiers du cinéma, said that the love between the women depicted is "of lyricism practically without equal in contemporary cinema". In the pages of Film Comment, Phillip Lopate states that the pivotal romantic interlude between Betty and Rita was made poignant and tender by Betty's "understanding for the first time, with self-surprise, that all her helpfulness and curiosity about the other woman had a point: desire ... It is a beautiful moment, made all the more miraculous by its earned tenderness, and its distances from anything lurid." Stephanie Zacharek of Salon magazine stated that the scene's "eroticism [was] so potent it blankets the whole movie, coloring every scene that came before and every one that follows". Betty and Rita were chosen by the Independent Film Channel as the emblematic romantic couple of the 2000s. Writer Charles Taylor said, "Betty and Rita are often framed against darkness so soft and velvety it's like a hovering nimbus, ready to swallow them if they awake from the film's dream. And when they are swallowed, when smoke fills the frame as if the sulfur of hell itself were obscuring our vision, we feel as if not just a romance has been broken, but the beauty of the world has been cursed."

Some film theorists have argued that Lynch inserts queerness in the aesthetic and thematic content of the film. The non-linear film is "incapable of sustaining narrative coherence", as Lee Wallace argues that, "lesbianism dissolves the ideological conventions of narrative realism, operating as the switch point for the contesting storyworlds within Lynch's elaborately plotted film". The presence of mirrors and doppelgangers throughout the film "are common representations of lesbian desire". The co-dependency in the relationship between Betty and Rita—which borders on outright obsession—has been compared to the female relationships in two similar films, Ingmar Bergman's Persona (1966) and Robert Altman's 3 Women (1977), which also depict identities of vulnerable women that become tangled, interchanging and ultimately merge: "The female couples also mirror each other, with their mutual interactions conflating hero(ine) worship with same-sex desire". Lynch pays direct homage to Persona in the scene where Rita dons the blonde wig, styled exactly like Betty's own hair. Rita and Betty then gaze at each other in the mirror "drawing attention to their physical similarity, linking the sequence to theme of embrace, physical coupling and the idea of merging or doubling". Mirroring and doubles, which are prominent themes throughout the film, serve to further queer the form and content of the film.

Several theorists have accused Lynch of perpetuating stereotypes and clichés of lesbians, bisexuals and lesbian relationships. Rita (the femme fatale) and Betty (the school girl) represent two classic stock lesbian characters; Heather Love identifies two key clichés used in the film: "Lynch presents lesbianism in its innocent and expansive form: lesbian desire appears as one big adventure, an entrée into a glamorous and unknown territory". Simultaneously, he presents the tragic lesbian triangle, "in which an attractive but unavailable woman dumps a less attractive woman who is figured as exclusively lesbian", perpetuating the stereotype of the bisexual "ending up with a man". Maria San Filippo recognizes that Lynch relies on classic film noir archetypes to develop Camilla's eventual betrayal: these archetypes "become ingrained to such a degree that viewers are immediately cued that "Rita" is not what she seems and that it is only a matter of time before she reveals her duplicitous nature." For Love, Diane's exclusively lesbian desire is "between success and failure, between sexiness and abjection, even between life and death" if she is rejected. Diane is the tragic lesbian cliché pining after the bisexual in the heterosexual relationship. Love's analysis of the film notes the media's peculiar response to the film's lesbian content: "reviewers rhapsodized in particular and at length about the film's sex scenes, as if there were a contest to see who could enjoy this representation of female same-sex desire the most." She points out that the film used a classic theme in literature and film depicting lesbian relationships: Camilla as achingly beautiful and available, rejecting Diane for Adam. Popular reaction to the film suggests the contrasting relationships between Betty and Rita and Diane and Camilla are "understood as both the hottest thing on earth and, at the same time, as something fundamentally sad and not at all erotic" as "the heterosexual order asserts itself with crushing effects for the abandoned woman".

Heterosexuality as primary is important in the latter half of the film, as the ultimate demise of Diane and Camilla's relationship springs from the matrimony of the heterosexual couple. At Adam's party, they begin to announce that Camilla and Adam are getting married; through laughs and kisses, the declaration is delayed because it is obvious and expected. The heterosexual closure of the scene is  interrupted by a scene change. As Lee Wallace suggests, by planning a hit against Camilla, "Diane circumvents the heterosexual closure of the industry story but only by going over to its storyworld, an act that proves fatal for both women, the cause and effect relations of the thriller being fundamentally incompatible with the plot of lesbianism as the film presents it".  For Joshua Bastian Cole,  Adam's character serves as Diane's foil, what she can never be, which is why Camilla leaves her. In her fantasy, Adam has his own subplot which leads to his humiliation. While this subplot can be understood as a revenge fantasy born from jealousy, Cole argues that this is an example of Diane's transgender gaze: "Adam functions like a mirror – a male object upon which Diane might project herself". Diane's prolonged eye-contact with Dan at Winkie's is another example of the trans gaze. For Cole, "Diane's strange recognition of Dan, which is not quite identification but something else, feels trans in its oblique line, drawn between impossible doubles" and their similar names (Dan/Diane) which is no mistake. He stresses that the lesbian understanding of the film has overshadowed potential trans interpretations; his reading of Diane's trans gaze is a contribution to the queer narrative of the film.

Media portrayals of Naomi Watts's and Laura Elena Harring's views of their onscreen relationships were varied and conflicting. Watts said of the filming of the scene, "I don't see it as erotic, though maybe it plays that way. The last time I saw it, I actually had tears in my eyes because I knew where the story was going. It broke my heart a little bit." However, in another interview Watts stated, "I was amazed how honest and real all this looks on screen. These girls look really in love and it was curiously erotic." While Harring was quoted saying, "The love scene just happened in my eyes. Rita's very grateful for the help Betty's given [her] so I'm saying goodbye and goodnight to her, thank you, from the bottom of my heart, I kiss her and then there's just an energy that takes us [over]. Of course I have amnesia so I don't know if I've done it before, but I don't think we're really lesbians." Heather Love agreed somewhat with Harring's perception when she stated that identity in Mulholland Drive is not as important as desire: "who we are does not count for much—what matters instead is what we are about to do, what we want to do."

Characters

Betty Elms (Naomi Watts) is the bright and talented newcomer to Los Angeles, described as "wholesome, optimistic, determined to take the town by storm", and "absurdly naïve". Her perkiness and intrepid approach to helping Rita because it is the right thing to do is reminiscent of Nancy Drew for reviewers. Her entire persona at first is an apparent cliché of small-town naïveté. But it is Betty's identity, or loss of it, that appears to be the focus of the film. For one critic, Betty performed the role of the film's consciousness and unconscious. Watts, who modeled Betty on Doris Day, Tippi Hedren and Kim Novak, observed that Betty is a thrill-seeker, someone "who finds herself in a world she doesn't belong in and is ready to take on a new identity, even if it's somebody else's". This has also led one theorist to conclude that since Betty had naïvely, yet eagerly entered the Hollywood system, she had become a "complicit actor" who had "embraced the very structure that" destroyed her. In an explanation of her development of the Betty character, Watts stated:

I had to therefore come up with my own decisions about what this meant and what this character was going through, what was dream and what was reality. My interpretation could end up being completely different, from both David and the audience. But I did have to reconcile all of that, and people seem to think it works.

Betty, however difficult to believe as her character is established, shows an astonishing depth of dimension in her audition. Previously rehearsed with Rita in the apartment, where Rita feeds her lines woodenly, the scene is "dreck" and "hollow; every line unworthy of a genuine actress's commitment", and Betty plays it in rehearsal as poorly as it is written. Nervous but plucky as ever at the audition, Betty enters the cramped room, but when pitted inches from her audition partner (Chad Everett), she turns it into a scene of powerful sexual tension that she fully controls and draws in every person in the room. The sexuality erodes immediately as the scene ends and she stands before them shyly waiting for their approval. One film analyst asserts that Betty's previously unknown ability steals the show, specifically, taking the dark mystery away from Rita and assigning it to herself, and by Lynch's use of this scene illustrates his use of deception in his characters. Betty's acting ability prompts Ruth Perlmutter to speculate if Betty is acting the role of Diane in either a dream or a parody of a film that ultimately turns against her.

Rita (Harring) is the mysterious and helpless apparent victim, a classic femme fatale with her dark, strikingly beautiful appearance. Roger Ebert was so impressed with Harring that he said of her "all she has to do is stand there and she is the first good argument in 55 years for a Gilda remake". She serves as the object of desire, directly oppositional to Betty's bright self-assuredness. She is also the first character with whom the audience identifies, and as viewers know her only as confused and frightened, not knowing who she is and where she is going, she represents their desire to make sense of the film through her identity. Instead of threatening, she inspires Betty to nurture, console and help her. Her amnesia makes her a blank persona, which one reviewer notes is "the vacancy that comes with extraordinary beauty and the onlooker's willingness to project any combination of angelic and devilish onto her". A character analysis of Rita asserts that her actions are the most genuine of the first portion of the film, since she has no memory and nothing to use as a frame of reference for how to behave. Todd McGowan, however, author of a book on themes in Lynch's films, states that the first portion of Mulholland Drive can be construed as Rita's fantasy, until Diane Selwyn is revealed; Betty is the object that overcomes Rita's anxiety about her loss of identity. According to film historian Steven Dillon, Diane transitions a former roommate into Rita: following a tense scene where the roommate collects her remaining belongings, Rita appears in the apartment, smiling at Diane.

After Betty and Rita find the decomposing body, they flee the apartment and their images are split apart and reintegrated. David Roche notes that Rita's lack of identity causes a breakdown that "occurs not only at the level of the character but also at the level of the image; the shot is subjected to special effects that fragment their image and their voices are drowned out in reverb, the camera seemingly writing out the mental state of the characters". Immediately they return to Betty's aunt's apartment where Rita dons a blonde wig—ostensibly to disguise herself—but making her look remarkably like Betty. It is this transformation that one film analyst suggests is the melding of both identities. This is supported by visual clues, like particular camera angles making their faces appear to be merging into one. This is further illustrated soon after by their sexual intimacy, followed by Rita's personality becoming more dominant as she insists they go to Club Silencio at 2 a.m., that eventually leads to the total domination by Camilla.

Diane Selwyn (Watts) is the palpably frustrated and depressed woman, who seems to have ridden the coattails of Camilla, whom she idolizes and adores, but who does not return her affection. She is considered to be the reality of the too-good-to-be-true Betty, or a later version of Betty after living too long in Hollywood. For Steven Dillon, the plot of the film "makes Rita the perfect empty vessel for Diane's fantasies", but because Rita is only a "blank cover girl" Diane has "invested herself in emptiness", which leads her to depression and apparently to suicide. Hence, Diane is the personification of dissatisfaction, painfully illustrated when she is unable to climax while masturbating, in a scene that indicates "through blurred, jerky, point of view shots of the stony wall—not only her tears and humiliation but the disintegration of her fantasy and her growing desire for revenge". One analysis of Diane suggests her devotion to Camilla is based on a manifestation of narcissism, as Camilla embodies everything Diane wants and wants to be. Although she is portrayed as weak and the ultimate loser, for Jeff Johnson, author of a book about morality in Lynch films, Diane is the only character in the second portion of the film whose moral code remains intact. She is "a decent person corrupted by the miscellaneous miscreants who populate the film industry". Her guilt and regret are evident in her suicide, and in the clues that surface in the first portion of the film. Rita's fear, the dead body and the illusion at Club Silencio indicate that something is dark and wrong in Betty and Rita's world. In becoming free from Camilla, her moral conditioning kills her.

Camilla Rhodes (Melissa George, Laura Elena Harring) is little more than a face in a photo and a name that has inspired many representatives of some vaguely threatening power to place her in a film against the wishes of Adam. Referred to as a "vapid moll" by one reviewer, she barely makes an impression in the first portion of the film, but after the blue box is opened and she is portrayed by Harring, she becomes a full person who symbolizes "betrayal, humiliation and abandonment", and is the object of Diane's frustration. Diane is a sharp contrast to Camilla, who is more voluptuous than ever, and who appears to have "sucked the life out of Diane". Immediately after telling Diane that she drives her wild, Camilla tells her they must end their affair. On a film set where Adam is directing Camilla, he orders the set cleared, except for Diane—at Camilla's request—where Adam shows another actor just how to kiss Camilla correctly. Instead of punishing Camilla for such public humiliation, as is suggested by Diane's conversation with the bungling hit man, one critic views Rita as the vulnerable representation of Diane's desire for Camilla.

Adam Kesher (Justin Theroux) is established in the first portion of the film as a "vaguely arrogant", but apparently successful, director who endures one humiliation after another. Theroux said of his role, "He's sort of the one character in the film who doesn't know what the [hell's] going on. I think he's the one guy the audience says, 'I'm kind of like you right now. I don't know why you're being subjected to all this pain. After being stripped of creative control of his film, he is cuckolded by the pool cleaner (played by Billy Ray Cyrus), and thrown out of his own opulent house above Hollywood. After he checks into a seedy motel and pays with cash, the manager arrives to tell him that his credit is no good. Witnessed by Diane, Adam is pompous and self-important. He is the only character whose personality does not seem to change completely from the first part of the film to the second. One analysis of Adam's character contends that because he capitulated and chose Camilla Rhodes for his film, that is the end of Betty's cheerfulness and ability to help Rita, placing the blame for her tragedy on the representatives of studio power. Another analysis suggests that "Adam Kesher does not have the control, he wants and is willing to step over who or what is necessary to consolidate his career. Hungry for power, he uses the appearance of love or seduction only as one more tool. Love for power justifies that everything else is forgotten, be it pride, love or any other consideration. There are no regrets, it is Mulholland Drive in Los Angeles."

Minor characters include The Cowboy (Monty Montgomery), the Castigliani Brothers (Dan Hedaya and Angelo Badalamenti) and Mr. Roque (Michael J. Anderson), all of whom are somehow involved in pressuring Adam to cast Camilla Rhodes in his film. These characters represent the death of creativity for film scholars, and they portray a "vision of the industry as a closed hierarchical system in which the ultimate source of power remains hidden behind a series of representatives". Ann Miller portrays Coco, the landlady who welcomes Betty to her wonderful new apartment. Coco, in the first part of the film, represents the old guard in Hollywood, who welcomes and protects Betty. In the second part of the film, however, she appears as Adam's mother, who impatiently chastises Diane for being late to the party and barely pays attention to Diane's embarrassed tale of how she got into acting.

Style

The filmmaking style of David Lynch has been written about extensively using descriptions like "ultraweird", "dark" and "oddball". Todd McGowan writes, "One cannot watch a Lynch film the way one watches a standard Hollywood film noir nor in the way that one watches most radical films." Through Lynch's juxtaposition of cliché and surreal, nightmares and fantasies, nonlinear story lines, camera work, sound and lighting, he presents a film that challenges viewers to suspend belief of what they are experiencing. Many of the characters in Mulholland Drive are archetypes that can only be perceived as cliché: the new Hollywood hopeful, the femme fatale, the maverick director and shady powerbrokers that Lynch never seems to explore fully. Lynch places these often hackneyed characters in dire situations, creating dream-like qualities. By using these characters in scenarios that have components and references to dreams, fantasies and nightmares, viewers are left to decide, between the extremes, what is reality. One film analyst, Jennifer Hudson, writes of him, "Like most surrealists, Lynch's language of the unexplained is the fluid language of dreams."

David Lynch uses various methods of deception in Mulholland Drive. A shadowy figure named Mr. Roque, who seems to control film studios, is portrayed by dwarf actor Michael J. Anderson (also from Twin Peaks). Anderson, who has only two lines and is seated in an enormous wooden wheelchair, was fitted with oversized foam prosthetic arms and legs in order to portray his head as abnormally small. During Adam and Camilla's party, Diane watches Camilla (played by Harring) with Adam on one arm, lean over and deeply kiss the same woman who appeared as Camilla (Melissa George) before the blue box was opened. Both then turn and smile pointedly at Diane. Film critic Franklin Ridgway writes that the depiction of such a deliberate "cruel and manipulative" act makes it unclear if Camilla is as capricious as she seems, or if Diane's paranoia is allowing the audience only to see what she senses. In a scene immediately after Betty's audition, the film cuts to a woman singing without apparent accompaniment, but as the camera pulls backwards, the audience sees that it is a recording studio. In actuality, it is a sound stage where Betty has just arrived to meet Adam Kesher, that the audience realizes as the camera pulls back further. Ridgway insists that such deception through artful camera work sets the viewer full of doubt about what is being presented: "It is as if the camera, in its graceful fluidity of motion, reassures us that it (thinks it) sees everything, has everything under control, even if we (and Betty) do not."

According to Stephen Dillon, Lynch's use of different camera positions throughout the film, such as hand-held points of view, makes the viewer "identify with the suspense of the character in his or her particular space", but that Lynch at moments also "disconnects the camera from any particular point of view, thereby ungrounding a single or even a human perspective" so that the multiple perspectives keep contexts from merging, significantly troubling "our sense of the individual and the human". Andrew Hageman similarly notes that the camera work in the film "renders a very disturbing sense of place and presence", such as the scene in Winkie's where the "camera floats irregularly during the shot-reverse shot dialogue" by which the "spectator becomes aware that a set of normally objective shots have become disturbingly subjective". Scholar Curt Hersey recognizes several avant-garde techniques used in the film including lack of transitions, abrupt transitions, motion speed, nontraditional camera movement, computer-generated imagery, nondiegetic images, nonlinear narration and intertextuality.

The first portion of the film that establishes the characters of Betty, Rita and Adam presents some of the most logical filmmaking of Lynch's career. The later part of the film that represents reality to many viewers, however, exhibits a marked change in cinematic effect that gives it a quality just as surreal as the first part. Diane's scenes feature choppier editing and dirtier lighting that symbolize her physical and spiritual impoverishment, which contrasts with the first portion of the film where "even the plainest decor seems to sparkle", Betty and Rita glow with light and transitions between scenes are smooth. Lynch moves between scenes in the first portion of the film by using panoramic shots of the mountains, palm trees and buildings in Los Angeles. In the darker part of the film, sound transitions to the next scene without a visual reference where it is taking place. At Camilla's party, when Diane is most humiliated, the sound of crashing dishes is heard that carries immediately to the scene where dishes have been dropped in the diner, and Diane is speaking with the hit man. Sinnerbrink also notes that several scenes in the film, such as the one featuring Diane's hallucination of Camilla after Diane wakes up, the image of the being from behind Winkie's after Diane's suicide, or the "repetition, reversal and displacement of elements that were differently configured" in the early portion of the film, creates the uncanny effect where viewers are presented with familiar characters or situations in altered times or locations. Similarly, Hageman has identified the early scene at Winkie's as "extremely uncanny", because it is a scene where the "boundaries separating physical reality from the imaginary realities of the unconscious disintegrate". Author Valtteri Kokko has identified three groups of "uncanny metaphors"; the doppelgänger of multiple characters played by the same actors, dreams and an everyday object—primarily the blue box—that initiates Rita's disappearance and Diane's real life.

Another recurring element in Lynch's films is his experimentation with sound. He stated in an interview, "you look at the image and the scene silent, it's doing the job it's supposed to do, but the work isn't done. When you start working on the sound, keep working until it feels correct. There's so many wrong sounds and instantly you know it. Sometimes it's really magical." In the opening scene of the film, as the dark-haired woman stumbles off Mulholland Drive, silently it suggests she is clumsy. After Lynch added "a hint of the steam [from the wreck] and the screaming kids", however, it transformed Laura Elena Harring from clumsy to terrified. Lynch also infused subtle rumblings throughout portions of the film that reviewers noted added unsettling and creepy effects. Hageman also identifies "perpetual and uncanny ambient sound", and places a particular emphasis on the scene where the man collapses behind Winkie's as normal sound is drowned out by a buzzing roar, noting that the noise "creates a dissonance and suspense that draws in the spectator as detective to place the sound and reestablish order". Mulholland Drives ending with the woman at Club Silencio whispering is an example of Lynch's aural deception and surreality, according to Ruth Perlmutter, who writes, "The acting, the dreams, the search for identity, the fears and terrors of the undefined self are over when the film is over, and therefore, there is only silence and enigma."

Soundtrack

The soundtrack of Mulholland Drive was supervised by Angelo Badalamenti, who collaborated on previous Lynch projects Blue Velvet and Twin Peaks. Badalamenti, who was nominated for awards from the American Film Institute (AFI) and the British Academy of Film and Television Arts (BAFTA) for his work on the film, also has a cameo as an espresso aficionado and mobster.

Reviewers note that Badalamenti's ominous score, described as his "darkest yet", contributes to the sense of mystery as the film opens on the dark-haired woman's limousine, that contrasts with the bright, hopeful tones of Betty's first arrival in Los Angeles, with the score "acting as an emotional guide for the viewer". Film music journalist Daniel Schweiger remarks that Badalamenti's contribution to the score alternates from the "nearly motionless string dread to noir jazz and audio feedback", with "the rhythms building to an explosion of infinite darkness." Badalamenti described a particular technique of sound design applied to the film, by which he would provide Lynch with multiple ten- to twelve-minute tracks at slow tempo, that they called "firewood", from which Lynch "would take fragments and experiment with them resulting in a lot of film's eerie soundscapes."

Lynch uses two pop songs from the 1960s directly after one another, playing as two actresses are auditioning by lip synching them. According to an analyst of music used in Lynch films, Lynch's female characters are often unable to communicate through normal channels and are reduced to lip-synching or being otherwise stifled. Connie Stevens's "Sixteen Reasons" is the song being sung while the camera pans backwards to reveal several illusions, and Linda Scott's version of "I've Told Ev'ry Little Star" is the audition for the first Camilla Rhodes, that film scholar Eric Gans considers a song of empowerment for Betty. Originally written by Jerome Kern as a duet, sung by Linda Scott in this rendition by herself, Gans suggests it takes on a homosexual overtone in Mulholland Drive. Unlike "Sixteen Reasons", however, portions of "I've Told Ev'ry Little Star" are distorted to suggest "a sonic split-identity" for Camilla. When the song plays, Betty has just entered the sound stage where Adam is auditioning actresses for his film, and she sees Adam, locks eyes with him and abruptly flees after Adam has declared "This is the girl" about Camilla, thereby avoiding his inevitable rejection.

At the hinge of the film is a scene in an unusual late night theater called Club Silencio where a performer announces "No hay banda (there is no band) ... but yet we hear a band", variated between English, Spanish and French. Described as "the most original and stunning sequence in an original and stunning film", Rebekah Del Rio's Spanish a cappella rendition of "Crying", named "Llorando", is praised as "show-stopping ... except that there's no show to stop" in the sparsely attended Club Silencio. Lynch wanted to use Roy Orbison's version of "Crying" in Blue Velvet, but changed his mind when he heard Orbison's "In Dreams". Del Rio, who popularized the Spanish version and who received her first recording contract on the basis of the song, stated that Lynch flew to Nashville where she was living, and she sang the song for him once and did not know he was recording her. Lynch wrote a part for her in the film and used the version she sang for him in Nashville. The song tragically serenades the lovers Betty and Rita, who sit spellbound and weeping, moments before their relationship disappears and is replaced by Diane and Camilla's dysfunction. According to one film scholar, the song and the entire theater scene marks the disintegration of Betty's and Rita's personalities, as well as their relationship. With the use of multiple languages and a song to portray such primal emotions, one film analyst states that Lynch exhibits his distrust of intellectual discourse and chooses to make sense through images and sounds. The disorienting effect of the music playing although del Rio is no longer there is described as "the musical version of Magritte's painting Ceci n'est pas une pipe".

Release
Mulholland Drive premiered at the 2001 Cannes Film Festival in May to major critical acclaim. Lynch was awarded the Best Director prize at the festival, sharing it with co-winner Joel Coen for The Man Who Wasn't There. It drew positive reviews from many critics and some of the strongest audience reactions of Lynch's career.

The film was publicized with cryptic posters bearing the abbreviation "Mulholland Dr."

Box office
Universal Pictures released Mulholland Drive theatrically in 66 theaters in the United States on October 12, 2001, grossing $587,591 over its opening weekend. It eventually expanded to its widest release of 247 theaters, ultimately grossing $7,220,243 at the U.S. box office. TVA Films released the film theatrically in Canada on October 26, 2001. In other territories outside the United States, the film grossed $12,897,096, for a worldwide total of $20,117,339 on the film's original release, plus much smaller sums on later re-releases.

Reception and legacy
Since its release, Mulholland Drive has received "both some of the harshest epithets and some of the most lavish praise in recent cinematic history". On review aggregator website Rotten Tomatoes, the film has an approval rating of 85% based on 188 reviews, with an average rating of 7.7/10. The website's critical consensus reads, "David Lynch's dreamlike and mysterious Mulholland Drive is a twisty neo-noir with an unconventional structure that features a mesmerizing performance from Naomi Watts as a woman on the dark fringes of Hollywood." On Metacritic, which assigns a normalized rating to reviews, the film has a weighted average score of 86 out of 100 based on 35 critics, indicating "universal acclaim".

Roger Ebert of the Chicago Sun-Times, who had often been dismissive of Lynch's work, awarded the film four stars and said, "David Lynch has been working toward Mulholland Drive all of his career, and now that he's arrived there I forgive him for Wild at Heart and even Lost Highway ... the movie is a surrealist dreamscape in the form of a Hollywood film noir, and the less sense it makes, the more we can't stop watching it". Ebert subsequently added Mulholland Drive to his "Great Films" list. In The New York Times, Stephen Holden wrote that the film "ranks alongside Fellini's 8½ and other auteurist fantasias as a monumental self-reflection" and added: "Looked at lightly, it is the grandest and silliest cinematic carnival to come along in quite some time ... on a more serious level, its investigation into the power of movies pierces a void from which you can hear the screams of a ravenous demon whose appetites can never be slaked." Edward Guthmann of the San Francisco Chronicle called it "exhilarating ... for its dreamlike images and fierce, frequently reckless imagination" and added, "there's a mesmerizing quality to its languid pace, its sense of foreboding and its lost-in-time atmosphere ... it holds us, spellbound and amused, for all of its loony and luscious, exasperating 146 minutes [and] proves that Lynch is in solid form—and still an expert at pricking our nerves".

In Rolling Stone, Peter Travers observed, "Mulholland Drive makes movies feel alive again. This sinful pleasure is a fresh triumph for Lynch, and one of the best films of a sorry-ass year. For visionary daring, swooning eroticism and colors that pop like a whore's lip gloss, there's nothing like this baby anywhere." J. Hoberman of The Village Voice stated, "This voluptuous phantasmagoria ... is certainly Lynch's strongest movie since Blue Velvet and maybe Eraserhead. The very things that failed him in the bad-boy rockabilly debacle of Lost Highway—the atmosphere of free-floating menace, pointless transmigration of souls, provocatively dropped plot stitches, gimcrack alternate universes—are here brilliantly rehabilitated." A. O. Scott of The New York Times wrote that, while some might consider the plot an "offense against narrative order", the film is "an intoxicating liberation from sense, with moments of feeling all the more powerful for seeming to emerge from the murky night world of the unconscious".

Mulholland Drive was not without its detractors. Rex Reed of The New York Observer said that it was the worst film he had seen in 2001, calling it "a load of moronic and incoherent garbage". In New York, Peter Rainer observed, "Although I like it more than some of his other dreamtime freakfests, it's still a pretty moribund ride ... Lynch needs to renew himself with an influx of the deep feeling he has for people, for outcasts, and lay off the cretins and hobgoblins and zombies for a while." In The Washington Post, Desson Howe called it "an extended mood opera, if you want to put an arty label on incoherence". Todd McCarthy of Variety found much to praise—"Lynch cranks up the levels of bizarre humor, dramatic incident and genuine mystery with a succession of memorable scenes, some of which rank with his best"—but also noted, "the film jumps off the solid ground of relative narrative coherence into Lynchian fantasyland ... for the final 45 minutes, Lynch is in mind-twisting mode that presents a form of alternate reality with no apparent meaning or logical connection to what came before. Although such tactics are familiar from Twin Peaks and elsewhere, the sudden switcheroo to head games is disappointing because, up to this point, Lynch had so wonderfully succeeded in creating genuine involvement." James Berardinelli also criticized it, saying: "Lynch cheats his audience, pulling the rug out from under us. He throws everything into the mix with the lone goal of confusing us. Nothing makes any sense because it's not supposed to make any sense. There's no purpose or logic to events. Lynch is playing a big practical joke on us." Film theorist Ray Carney notes, "You wouldn't need all the emotional back-flips and narrative trap doors if you had anything to say. You wouldn't need doppelgangers and shadow-figures if your characters had souls."

Later, Mulholland Drive was named the best film of the decade by the Los Angeles Film Critics Association, Cahiers du cinéma, IndieWire, Slant Magazine, Reverse Shot, The Village Voice and Time Out New York, who asked rhetorically in a reference to the September 11 attacks, "Can there be another movie that speaks as resonantly—if unwittingly—to the awful moment that marked our decade? ... Mulholland Drive is the monster behind the diner; it's the self-delusional dream turned into nightmare." It was also voted best of the decade in a Film Comment poll of international "critics, programmers, academics, filmmakers and others", and by the magazine's readers. It appeared on lists among the ten best films of the decade, coming in third according to The Guardian, Rolling Stone critic Peter Travers, the Canadian Press, Access Hollywood critic Scott Mantz, and eighth on critic Michael Phillips's list. In 2010 it was named the second best arthouse film ever by The Guardian. The film was voted as the 11th best film set in Los Angeles in the last 25 years by a group of Los Angeles Times writers and editors with the primary criterion of communicating an inherent truth about the L.A. experience. Empire magazine placed Mulholland Drive at number 391 on their list of the five hundred greatest films ever. It has also been ranked number 38 on the Channel 4 program 50 Films to See Before You Die. In 2011, online magazine Slate named Mulholland Drive in its piece on "New Classics" as the most enduring film since 2000.

In the British Film Institute's 2012 Sight & Sound poll, Mulholland Drive was ranked the 28th greatest film ever made, and in the 2022 poll, its ranking rose to 8th.  Having received 40 critics' votes, it is one of only two films from the 21st century to be included in the list, along with 2000's In the Mood for Love. In a 2015 BBC poll, it was ranked 21st among all American films. The following year, Mulholland Drive was named as the greatest film of the 21st century in a poll conducted by BBC Culture. In July 2021, Mulholland Drive was shown in the Cannes Classics section at the 2021 Cannes Film Festival.

Home media
The film was released on VHS and DVD by Universal Studios Home Video on April 9, 2002, in the United States and Canada, with few special features. It was released without chapter stops, a feature that Lynch objects to on the grounds that it "demystifies" the film. 

In spite of Lynch's concerns, the DVD release included a cover insert that provided "David Lynch's 10 Clues to Unlocking This Thriller", which were: 

"1) Pay particular attention to the 	beginning of the film: At least two clues are revealed before the credits.

2) Notice appearances of the red lampshade.

3) Can you hear the title of the film that Adam Kesher is auditioning actresses for? Is it mentioned again?

4) An accident is a terrible event... notice the location of the accident.

5) Who gives a key, and why?

6) Notice the robe, the ashtray, the coffee cup.

7) What is felt, realized, and gathered at the club Silencio?

8) Did talent alone help Camilla?

9) Note the occurrences surrounding the man behind Winkies.

10) Where is Aunt Ruth?"

One DVD reviewer noted that the clues may be "big obnoxious red herrings". 

Nick Coccellato of Eccentric Cinema gave the film a rating of nine out of ten and the DVD release an eight out of ten, saying that the lack of special features "only adds to the mystery the film itself possesses, in abundance". Special features in later versions and overseas versions of the DVD include a Lynch interview at the Cannes Film Festival and highlights of the debut of the film at Cannes.

Optimum Home Entertainment released Mulholland Drive to the European market on Blu-ray as part of its StudioCanal Collection on September 13, 2010. New special features exclusive to this release include: an introduction by Thierry Jousse; In the Blue Box, a retrospective documentary featuring directors and critics; two making-of documentaries: On the Road to Mulholland Drive and Back to Mulholland Drive, and several interviews with people involved in making the film. It is the second David Lynch film in this line of Blu-rays after The Elephant Man.

On July 15, 2015, The Criterion Collection announced that it would release Mulholland Drive, newly restored through a 4K digital transfer, on DVD and Blu-ray on October 27, 2015, both of which include new interviews with the film's crew and the 2005 edition of Chris Rodley's book Lynch on Lynch, along with the original trailer and other extras. It was Lynch's second film to receive a Criterion Collection release on DVD and Blu-ray, following Eraserhead which was released in September 2014.

On August 11, 2021, Criterion announced their first 4K Ultra HD releases, a six-film slate, will include Mulholland Drive. Criterion indicated each title will be available in a 4K UHD+Blu-ray combo pack including a 4K UHD disc of the feature film as well as the film and special features on the companion Blu-ray.  Criterion confirmed on August 16, 2021, that Mulholland Drive will be released on November 16, 2021, as a 4K and Blu-ray disc package.

Awards and honors
Lynch was nominated for an Academy Award for Best Director for the film. From the Hollywood Foreign Press, the film received four Golden Globe nominations, including Best Picture (Drama), Best Director and Best Screenplay. It was named Best Picture by the New York Film Critics Circle at the 2001 New York Film Critics Circle Awards and Online Film Critics Society.

See also
 List of films featuring miniature people

References

Bibliography

External links

 Mulholland Drive at LynchNet.com – includes interviews, press kit, film clips
 Mulholland Drive at Critics Round Up
 
 
 
 
 
 Lost on Mulholland Drive – comprehensive analysis and resource center
  – found within the DVD 
David Lynch' Interview on Mulholland Drrive

2001 films
2001 independent films
2001 LGBT-related films
2001 psychological thriller films
2001 thriller drama films
2000s avant-garde and experimental films
2000s mystery drama films
2000s mystery thriller films
2000s psychological drama films
American avant-garde and experimental films
American independent films
American LGBT-related films
American mystery drama films
American mystery thriller films
American neo-noir films
American nonlinear narrative films
American psychological drama films
American psychological thriller films
American thriller drama films
BAFTA winners (films)
Best Foreign Film César Award winners
2000s English-language films
Female bisexuality in film
Films about actors
Films about amnesia
Films about Hollywood, Los Angeles
Films about nightmares
Films directed by David Lynch
Films produced by Alain Sarde
Films scored by Angelo Badalamenti
Films set in Los Angeles
Films shot in Los Angeles
Films with screenplays by David Lynch
French avant-garde and experimental films
French independent films
French LGBT-related films
French mystery drama films
French mystery thriller films
French neo-noir films
French nonlinear narrative films
French psychological drama films
French psychological thriller films
French thriller drama films
Lesbian-related films
LGBT-related thriller drama films
National Society of Film Critics Award for Best Film winners
StudioCanal films
Television pilots not picked up as a series
Universal Pictures films
2000s American films
2000s French films
Postmodern films